John Richard Rarick (January 29, 1924 - September 14, 2009) was an American lawyer, jurist, and World War II veteran who served four terms in the U.S. House of Representatives, serving Louisiana's 6th congressional district from 1967 to 1975.

Early life and career
John Rarick was born in Waterford, Indiana in 1924. He attended Indiana’s Goshen High School before enlisting in the Army. As a cadet, he was stationed at barracks that had been set up at Louisiana State University in Baton Rouge.

World War II 
During World War II, Rarick fought in the Battle of the Bulge, where he was captured by the Germans and held as a prisoner of war. In recognition of his service during the war, Rarick was awarded the Bronze Star and earned a Purple Heart.

After the War
After the war, he returned to Louisiana and enrolled at LSU. After graduation, he attended Tulane University School of Law, where he earned his Juris Doctor in 1949. He passed the Louisiana bar exam and began a private practice in Louisiana.

In 1961, he was elected district judge in Louisiana’s Twentieth Judicial District. He served in that capacity until May 15, 1966, when he resigned to run for Congress.

Tenure in Congress 
After defeating incumbent Democratic Congressman James Morrison in the 1966 primary, Rarick won election to 90th U.S. Congress, representing Louisiana’s 6th Congressional District. He won re-election in 1968, 1970, and 1972.

During his time in Congress, Rarick gained a reputation for racially-tinged rhetoric, frequently inserting into the Congressional Record criticisms and personal attacks directed at Black and Jewish leaders of the day, including Supreme Court Justice Thurgood Marshall and civil rights icon Martin Luther King Jr.

In 1972, Congressman Charles Diggs of Detroit called Rarick “the leading racist in Congress” after Rarick testified against a committee measure providing Washington, DC self-governing home rule. Rarick had testified that groups such as the “Black Muslims” could gain control of Washington, D.C. should the city be allowed to govern itself.

In 1967, he made an unsuccessful run for governor of Louisiana, losing to incumbent Democrat John McKeithen by a wide margin.

1974 election
Running for re-election to a fifth term, Rarick was defeated in the 1974 Democratic primary by 29-year old challenger Jeff LaCaze. Rarick’s defeat created an opportunity for Republican candidate Henson Moore, who beat LaCaze by 44 votes in the November general election. The election was ordered to be rerun by court order, with Moore defeating LaCaze by a 54% to 46% margin in the rerun.

Later career
After leaving office, Rarick returned to Louisiana, resuming the practice of law and becoming involved in local community causes.

He unsuccessfully ran for election to his former congressional seat as an independent candidate in 1976. He also ran unsuccessfully for president in 1980 under the label of the American Independent Party.

Rarick supported David Duke, former Grand Wizard of the Knights of the Ku Klux Klan, during his campaign in the 1991 Louisiana gubernatorial election. Rarick spoke at several Duke campaign rallies around the state.

Death
John Rarick died in St. Francisville, Louisiana on September 14, 2009, at the age of 85. He was preceded in death by his first wife, Marguerite Pierce Rarick. He was survived by his second wife, Frances Eldred Campbell Rarick, as well as his three children.

References

External links

John R. Rarick Political Collection, Center for Southeast Louisiana Studies, Southeastern Louisiana University

|-

1924 births
2009 deaths
20th-century far-right politicians in the United States
Louisiana lawyers
Tulane University Law School alumni
20th-century American lawyers
20th-century American politicians
Democratic Party members of the United States House of Representatives from Louisiana
Louisiana State University alumni
20th-century American judges
American segregationists
Conservatism in the United States
American Independent Party presidential nominees
American white supremacists